Orthotylus nassatus is a species of bug from a family of Miridae that can be found everywhere in Europe except for Andorra, Liechtenstein, and various European islands. and east across the Palearctic to Siberia and from Asia Minor to the Caucasus.

Description
Antennas are pale from above, with a dark line on the underside.

Ecology
The species feeds on trees, like: lime, oak, and ash. They are active from July–September.

References

Insects described in 1787
nassatus
Hemiptera of Europe